The 1935–36 Rugby Union County Championship was the 43rd edition of England's premier rugby union club competition at the time.

Hampshire won the competition for the second time after defeating Northumberland in the final.

Final

See also
 English rugby union system
 Rugby union in England

References

Rugby Union County Championship
County Championship (rugby union) seasons